Sabrina Comberlato (born 19 July 1969) is an Italian softball player who competed in the 2000 Summer Olympics.

References

1969 births
Living people
Italian softball players
Olympic softball players of Italy
Softball players at the 2000 Summer Olympics
Sportspeople from Bologna